The 1970 British League Division Two season was the third season of second tier motorcycle speedway in Great Britain.

Team changes
The league expanded from 16 to 17 teams in its third season. Plymouth Devils dropped out but two new teams had been created and joined the league, they were the Workington Comets and Peterborough Panthers. Before the season got underway the 1968 and 1969 champions Belle Vue Colts disbanded with most of their riders and the promotion team moving to Rochdale and becoming the Rochdale Hornets. Doncaster changed their nickname from Stallions to Dragons.

Summary
Two teams changed venue during the season. In July, the Nelson Admirals moved to Bradford to become Bradford Northern and in August, the King's Lynn Starlets promotion moved to Boston and became the Boston Barracudas.

Canterbury Crusaders won their first title. New Zealander Graeme Smith averaged 10.49 for the Crusaders and was well backed up by Barry Crowson (9.17) and Barry Thomas (9.11). Another New Zealander Gary Peterson topped the averages riding initially for the Nelson Admirals and then Bradford Northern.

Final table

British League Division Two Knockout Cup
The 1970 British League Division Two Knockout Cup was the third edition of the Knockout Cup for tier two teams. Ipswich Witches were the winners of the competition defeating Berwick Bandits in the final. The Bandits were surprise finalists given their final league placing which was second from bottom of the table.

First round

+ first match abandoned with score at 25-17

Quarter-finals

Semi-finals

Final
First leg

Second leg

Ipswich were declared Knockout Cup Champions, winning on aggregate 82–74.

Final leading averages

Riders' final averages
Berwick

Doug Wyer 8.39
Maury Robinson 8.13
Peter Kelly 7.28
Bernie Lagrosse/Roy Williams 6.00
Ken Omand 5.41
Alan Paynter 5.26
Peter Baldock 5.14
Ian Paterson 5.03
Alistair Brady 4.89
Andy Meldrum 4.80
Jimmy Gallacher 3.53

Boston/King's Lynn (Boston took over fixtures mid-season)

Arthur Price 7.52 
Graham Edmonds 7.27
Russ Osborne 5.70
Jack Bywater 4.97
Tony Featherstone 4.26
John Ingamells 3.73 
Brian Osborn 3.62

Bradford (Bradford took over Nelson's fixtures mid-season)

Gary Peterson 10.76
Alf Wells 9.32
Alan Knapkin 9.28
Dave Schofield 6.15 
Sid Sheldrick 5.93
Alan Bridgett 5.85
Peter Thompson 5.22
Robin Adlington 4.35

Canterbury

Graeme Smith 10.49
Barry Crowson 9.17
Barry Thomas 9.11
Graham Banks 7.53
Graham Miles 7.44
Alan Kite 4.76
Jake Rennison 4.30
Dave Smith 4.07
Mike Barkaway 3.77

Crayford

Archie Wilkinson 9.54 
Tony Childs 7.97 
George Devonport 7.00 
Derek Timms 5.19 
Mick Steel 4.98
Tony Armstrong 4.55
Colin Clark 4.00
Judd Drew 3.91

Crewe

Paul O'Neil 9.69 
John Jackson 7.94 
Barry Meeks 7.13
Dai Evans 6.34
Warren Hawkins 6.10
Ian Bottomley 5.91
Dave Parry 5.65
Glyn Blackburn 5.28
Rob Jackson 5.04

Doncaster

George Major 9.58
Gordon McGregor 9.36
Chris Harrison 6.82 
Gunther Haslinger 4.99
Chris Roynon 4.36
Dennis Wasden 3.89
Ian Wilson 3.72
Malcolm Corradine 3.64
Cliff Emms 3.40

Eastbourne

Dave Jessup 9.66 
Derek Cook 8.44
Reg Trott 7.52
Alby Golden 7.12
Phil Pratt 7.08
Gordon Kennett 6.79
Mac Woolford 6.31
Laurie Sims 5.98
Dave Kennett 3.36

Ipswich

John Harrhy 9.21
John Louis 8.74
Pete Bailey 7.60 
Ron Bagley 7.03
Ted Spittles 5.92 
Neville Slee 4.54
Dave Whittaker 4.15
Bernie Aldridge 3.91
Stan Pepper 3.55

Long Eaton

Malcolm Shakespeare 8.83
Ken Vale 6.68
Geoff Bouchard 5.85
Roy Carter 5.65
Gil Farmer 5.20
Peter Wrathall 5.12
Colin Tucker 4.43
Steve Bass 3.21
Peter Gay 2.67

Middlesbrough
 
Tom Leadbitter 9.55
Roger Mills 7.43
Bruce Forrester 7.28
Tim Swales 7.13
Bob Jameson 6.63
Dave Durham 5.63
Pete Reading 5.41

Peterborough

Andy Ross 9.08
John Poyser 7.65
Richard Greer 7.49
Peter Seaton 7.14
Brian Davies 6.91
Joe Hughes 5.88
John Stayte 5.03
Pete Saunders 4.61
Mervyn Hill 4.53

Rayleigh

Geoff Maloney 8.74 
Hugh Saunders 7.58
Alan Jackson 7.06
Terry Stone 6.85
Nigel Rackett 6.38
Garry Moore 4.70
Allen Emmett 4.40
George Barclay 4.18
Tony Hall 3.69
Ian Champion 3.44

Reading

Richard May 9.57
Mike Vernam 9.01
Bernie Leigh 6.91
Bob Young 6.11
Phil Pratt 5.36
Dene Davies 5.28
John Hammond 5.05
Cec Platt 4.20

Rochdale

Eric Broadbelt 10.07
Taffy Owen 9.43
Chris Bailey 8.22
Steve Waplington 8.04
Alan Wilkinson 8.00
Paul Tyrer 6.81
Ken Moss 6.25
Gerry Richardson 4.86
Colin Goad 4.46

Romford

Phil Woodcock 8.87
Ross Gilbertson 8.70
Geoff Penniket 8.43
Des Lukehurst 8.26
Brian Foote 6.85
Colin Sanders 6.17
Ian Gills 5.69
Charlie Benham 5.35
Kevin Holden 4.65
John Hibben 2.83

Workington

Taffy Owen 9.94 (7 matches only)
Bob Valentine 9.37
Malcolm MacKay 7.56
Geoff Penniket 7.23
Reg Wilson 6.51
Lou Sansom 6.13
Ian Armstrong 5.00
Chris Blythe 4.22
Dave Kumeta 3.84
Vic Lonsdale 3.70

See also
List of United Kingdom Speedway League Champions
Knockout Cup (speedway)

References

Speedway British League Division Two / National League